Andraca olivacea is a moth of the family Endromidae. It is found in China (Fujian, Guangdong, Guangxi, Hainan), Taiwan and Vietnam.

The wingspan is 36–38 mm.

The larvae feed on Ficus concinna var. pusillifolia.

Subspecies
Andraca olivacea olivacea
Andraca olivacea olivacens Mell, 1958 (Fujian)

References

Moths described in 1927
Andraca
Taxa named by Shōnen Matsumura